VH1 Uno (or VHUno in some promotional materials and TV listings) was a digital cable and satellite television channel which was a sister channel of VH1. It featured a mix of Latin pop and ballads, tropical, salsa, merengue, tejano, Latin soul, reggaeton and urban hip hop, featuring top artists like Marc Anthony, Jennifer Lopez, Celia Cruz, Shakira and Luis Miguel.

As with CMT's digital sister network CMT Pure Country (formerly VH1 Country), VH1 Uno could be thought of as an all-music video version of MTV Tr3s.

On February 2, 2008, the channel was discontinued by what was then MTV Networks to expand distribution of the college-focused cable channel MTVU into normal cable homes.

References

External links
 Official site, as archived March 6, 2009 by the Internet Archive Wayback Machine

Defunct music video networks
Defunct television networks in the United States
Television channels and stations disestablished in 2008
Television channels and stations established in 2001
VH1